Johnny Rivers at the Whisky à Go Go (shown as "At Whisky-A-Go-Go" on the original label) is a live album and is the debut album from American rock and roll singer, songwriter and guitarist Johnny Rivers.

The album was released in February 1964, just as The Beatles and the British music invasion was getting into full swing. Rivers was asked to open the Whisky a Go Go nightclub in Los Angeles starting January 15, 1964 and during that run he recorded the album. With the help of producer Lou Adler, Johnny helped introduce the "Go Go sound" to rock and roll. The album reached #13 on Billboard's Pop Albums chart, (#12 on the Billboard 200) and became Johnny's first gold album. The album also gave Rivers his very first big hit, a cover version of Chuck Berry's 1959 hit "Memphis". Rivers's version went to #2 on Billboard's Pop Singles chart in the summer of 1964, and stayed there for twelve weeks. It became his first gold single.

Johnny Rivers at the Whisky à Go Go would be the first of five albums that Rivers would record live at the nightclub, and is not to be confused with Johnny Rivers Live at the Whisky à Go Go, an entirely different album which was released in Germany.

Track listing 
 "Memphis" (Chuck Berry) – 2:44
 "It Wouldn't Happen with Me" (Raymond Evans) – 3:30 
 "Oh Lonesome Me" (Don Gibson) –  2:37 
 "Lawdy Miss Clawdy" (Lloyd Price) –  3:00 
 "Whiskey a Go Go" (Johnny Rivers) –  3:57 
 "Walking the Dog" (Rufus Thomas) –  3:51 
 "Brown Eyed Handsome Man" (Berry) –  2:36 
 "You Can Have Her (I Don't Want Her)" (Bill Cook) –  3:20 
 "Multiplication" (Bobby Darin) –  2:51 
 "Medley: La Bamba" (Traditional; arranged by Johnny Rivers) / "Twist and Shout" (Phil Medley, Bert Russell) –  6:22

Personnel

Musicians
 Johnny Rivers – vocals, guitar
 Joe Osborn – bass
 Eddie Rubin – drums

Technical
 Lou Adler – producer
 Bones Howe, Harold "Lanky" Linstrot – studio engineers
 Wally Heider – remote engineer
 Studio Five – cover design, photography

References

Johnny Rivers albums
Albums produced by Lou Adler
1964 live albums
Albums recorded at the Whisky a Go Go
1964 debut albums
Imperial Records live albums